This is a list of organisations that are associated with the Labour Party. Some are official party organisations, some (like the Co-operative Party) are independent organisations, and others are organisations made up of party members which are not officially recognised by the party. Socialist societies and affiliated trade unions are affiliated independent organisations, with voting and representational rights within the Labour Party.

Partner organisations
The Co-operative Party
Party of European Socialists
Socialist International
Trades Union Congress (TUC)
Young Labour

Magazines
Chartist
Tribune

Think tanks and lobby groups
Blue Labour - founded 2010, pressure group that advocates the idea that working-class voters will be won back to Labour through socially conservative ideas on specific social and international issues
Campaign for Labour Party Democracy (CLPD) - founded 1973, group of Labour activists campaigning for changes to the constitution of the Labour Party to ensure that Labour MPs and Labour governments enacted policies agreeable to the party membership
Campaign for Socialism - pressure group of Scottish Labour members and supporters
Campaign for Democratic Socialism (CDS) - 1960–1964, pressure group representing the right wing of the party of members who supported the then-party Labour leader, Hugh Gaitskell
Centre-Left Grassroots Alliance (CLGA) - founded 1998, centre-left group representing members of the Labour membership from the centre to the left
Clause Four Group - 1970s–1991, a group student politics set up to oppose Militant 
Compass - founded 2003, think tank direction for the democratic left
Fabian Society - founded 1884, think tank advancing the principles of democratic socialism via gradualist and reformist effort in democracies
Independent Labour Publications (ILP) - founded 1975, pressure group which rejects contemporary capitalism and the command economy but accepts the idea of a market economy as part of democratic socialist thinking
Institute for Public Policy Research (IPPR) - founded 1988, think tank which offers theoretical analysis for modernisers in the UK Labour Party; offering alternatives to free market fundamentalism
Institute for Workers' Control - founded in 1968, shop stewards and militant workers who discussed workers' control of production
Labour Buzz - news platform reporting truthful, accurate and balanced news, covering everything to do with the Labour party, while also holding the Conservative party, and others to account.
Labour Campaign for Electoral Reform - founded 1980, a group of Labour politicians and grassroots members promoting democratic and constitutional reforms centred on proportional representation
Labour Co-ordinating Committee (LCC) - 1978–1998, group established to challenge the leadership of the party from the left to the vanguard of Tony Blair's drive to modernise the party's organisation and policies
Labour First - founded 1988, pressure group representing non-Blairite traditional right who self-describe as moderates
Labour for a Green New Deal - founded March 2019, a grassroots campaign to push the party to adopt a radical Green New Deal to transform the UK economy, tackle inequality and address the escalating climate crisis.
Labour for a New Democracy - a coalition to secure a commitment to proportional representation for the House of Commons from the Labour Party.
Labour for a Republic - founded 2012, pressure group advocating the abolition of the monarchy in favour of an elected head of state and democratic republic
Labour for Independence - founded 2012, organisation for Scottish Labour supporters who believe Scottish independence will lead to a fairer society
Labour Future - non-sectarian Labour supporters group with a focus on delivering a Labour government as soon as possible
Labour Left Briefing, monthly political magazine produced by members of the British Labour Party
Labour Representation Committee (LRC) - founded 2004, pressure group fighting for power within the Labour Party and trade unions and to appeal to the electorate disillusioned and despaired by New Labour
Labour Together - network for activists from all traditions of the Labour movement to explore new ideas and thinking on the future of the left
Labour Vision
Momentum - founded 2015, pressure group supportive of Jeremy Corbyn and the Labour Party
Militant - 1964–1991, Trotskyist group
Open Labour - founded 2015, a forum aimed at renewing Labour's soft left
Progress - founded 1996, pressure group standard-bearer for New Labour
Socialist Campaign for a Labour Victory (SCLV) - founded 1978, refounded 2015 to campaign for a Labour government with clear working-class demands, to boost working-class confidence, and strengthen and transform the labour movement
Socialist Campaign Group - founded 1982, left-wing, democratic socialist grouping of Labour MPs
Welsh Labour Grassroots - Momentum in Wales

Interest groups
Arts for Labour
BAME Labour, formerly Labour Party Black Sections and Black Socialist Society
Christians on the Left, formerly Christian Socialist Movement
Computing for Labour
Disability Labour
East and Southeast Asians for Labour
Grassroots Black Left
British Muslim Friends of Labour (BMFL)
Hindus for Labour
Jewish Labour Movement, formerly Poale Zion (Great Britain)
Jewish Voice for Labour (JVL)
Labour Against the War
Labour Against the Witchhunt
Labour and Palestine
Labour Animal Welfare Society
Labour Campaign for Drug Policy Reform (LCDPR)
Labour Campaign for Electoral Reform (LCER)
Labour Campaign for Human Rights (LCTR)
Labour Campaign for Trans Rights
Labour CND
Labour for a Republic
Labour Friends of Israel
Labour Friends of Palestine & the Middle East
Labour Housing Group
Labour Humanists
Labour Leave
Labour Movement for Europe
Labour Muslim Network
Labour Party Irish Society
Labour Land Campaign
Labour Middle East Council
Labour Party Marxists
Labour Students
Labour Women's Network
LGBT Labour
Momentum Black Caucus
National Union of Labour and Socialist Clubs
Peace and Justice Project
Scientists for Labour
Socialist Educational Association
Socialist Environment and Resources Association (SERA)
Socialist Health Association
Society of Labour Lawyers
Tribune Group of MPs - soft left group of MPs

See also
Labour Party (UK) affiliated trade union
Socialist society (Labour Party)

References

Organisations